Kyzyl-Mazhalyk (Kızıl-Majalık) is a rural locality (a selo) and the administrative center of Barun-Khemchiksky District of Tuva, Russia. Population:

References

Notes

Sources

Rural localities in Tuva